AMEI, or Amei, or A-mei may refer to:
 A-mei (张惠妹), a Taiwanese pop music singer
 Association of Musical Electronics Industry, a Japanese standards organization